Buqajeh-ye Pain (also Romanized as Būqājeh-ye Pā’īn) is a village in Golidagh Rural District, Golidagh District, Maraveh Tappeh County, Golestan Province, Iran. At the 2006 census, its population was 494, in 104 families.

See also

References 

Populated places in Maraveh Tappeh County